Helland Glacier is a glacier  long flowing southwest from Mount Paget to Rocky Bay, on the south side of South Georgia. It was mapped by Olaf Holtedahl during his visit to South Georgia in 1927–28, and named by him for Amund Helland, a Norwegian mining geologist and glaciologist.

See also 
 List of glaciers in the Antarctic
 Glaciology
Hellandfjellet

References

Glaciers of South Georgia